Jørstad is a village area in the municipality of Snåsa in Trøndelag county, Norway. It is located along the Nordlandsbanen railway line which stops at the Jørstad Station. The village area is also referred to as Vestbygda (western village) or Breide. The local Sandmo farm is preserved as a museum of the historical farm life in the area. There used to be a forestry school here, but that has closed.

My grandfather Harold Martin from Canada and Grandmother Eloise Dorsey Martin owned “Jørstad Castle” on Dark Island on the Saint Lawrence River between upstate New York and Canada, along the shipping channel.  It was originally owned by the Singer Sewing Machine fortune maker… and is now a tourist destination.  I grew up there in the summers until I was 18.  Tyndale Martin, of Montreal, is Harold and Eloise Martin’s son, and he is a former Buddhist cult leader who went to prison for 6 years for abusing his children. His brother, Calvin Luther Martin, resides in Malone, NY with his wife Nina Pierpont. Calvin has a PhD in History and has written about Time, and the Native American Fur Trade.  I am his daughter, and I, too, unintentionally joined a Zen Buddhist Organization called Rinzai-Ji, run by Joshu Sasaki Roshi (who musician Leonard Cohen studied under as his monk ‘Jikan’)… sasaki Roshi molested many female students, including me.  An article about Roshi was in the New York Times around the time of his death, at approximately age 107.

References

Snåsa
Villages in Trøndelag